The 2017–18 NBL Canada season is the seventh season of the National Basketball League of Canada (NBLC). The regular season ran November 18, 2017 to April 2, 2018.

League changes
After two years as league commissioner, Dave Magley left the league to found North American Premier Basketball. He was replaced on an interim basis by London Lightning owner and league president Vito Frijia.

After years of league ownership, the Moncton Miracles were folded to make way for an expansion team under new ownership called the Moncton Magic. The league also awarded expansion franchises in St. John's, Newfoundland and Labrador, and Sudbury, Ontario. However, the Sudbury ownership group delayed their launch in the league until 2019. The Orangeville A's folded in the Central Division, leaving the league with six teams in the Atlantic region and four in the Central. As a result, the new St. John's Edge were scheduled to play in the Central Division.

Offseason coaching changes 
 The Cape Breton Highlanders hired longtime NBLC head coach Rob Spon away from the Saint John Riptide, replacing their fired inaugural head coach Dean Murray and the interim Ben Resner.
The Island Storm hired Tim Kendrick to replace longtime Storm head coach, Joe Salerno.
The London Lightning hired Keith Vassell, former Niagara College head coach and the interim head coach of the Niagara River Lions the previous season. During the 2017 playoffs, then-Lightning head coach Kyle Julius notified ownership he would not return for the following season.
The Moncton Magic hired Joe Salerno as its inaugural head coach. Salerno had coached the previous season for the Island Storm.
The Niagara River Lions hired Joe Raso as its permanent head coach after Grâce Lokole stepped down during the previous season and Keith Vassell coached the rest of the season.
The Saint John Riptide hired Nelson Terroba to replace Rob Spon.
The St. John's Edge hired Jeff Dunlap as its inaugural head coach.

Midseason coaching changes
The KW Titans released Serge Langis on 25 February 2018 after a 5–22 record, and replaced him with former Titans' player Cavell Johnson.

Regular season 
Standings as of 2 April 2018:

Notes
z – Clinched home court advantage for the entire playoffs
c – Clinched home court advantage for the division playoffs
x – Clinched playoff spot

Attendance
As of games played 2 April 2018

Playoffs

Bold Series winner
Italic Team with home-court advantage

Draft
The 2017–18 NBL Canada Draft and Combine was held on October 20–22. The St. John's Edge selected Aaron Williams first.

Awards

Player of the Week award

Coach of the Month award

End-of-season awards
Source:
Most Valuable Player: Carl English, St. John's Edge
Canadian Player of the Year: Carl English, St. John's Edge
Newcomer of the Year: Franklin Session, Island Storm
Defensive Player of the Year: Du'Vaughn Maxwell, Island Storm
Rookie of the Year: Jaylon Tate, Niagara River Lions
Sixth Man of the Year: Ta'Quan Zimmerman, Halifax Hurricanes
Coach of the Year: Mike Leslie, Halifax Hurricanes

References

External links
NBL Canada website

 
National Basketball League of Canada seasons
2017–18 in Canadian basketball